is a Japanese actor and singer.

His ancestors were samurai of the Owari Domain and the family of the former samurai.

He graduated from Chiba Institute of Technology. He was a leader of a rock 'n' roll group Cools but he left the group soon after he joined Toei film company and made his film debut with The Classroom of Terror. In 1983, he moved to Yujiro Ishiharas production company. In the 1980s, he won great popularity through his roles in the TV drama series Seibu Keisatsu and Abunai Deka.

In 2018, Tachi won the Best Actor award at the 42nd Montreal World Film Festival for his role in Owatta Hito.

As a singer Tachi is known for his hit song Nakanaide and appeared in the Kōhaku Uta Gassen twice.

Filmography

Film
 The Classroom of Terror (1976)
 New Female Convict Scorpion Special: Block X (1977)
 Never Give up (1978) - Nariaki Oba
 Abunai Deka (1987) – Toshiki "Taka" Takayama
 Mata Mata Abunai Deka (1988) – Toshiki "Taka" Takayama
 Mottomo Abunai Deka (1989) – Toshiki "Taka" Takayama
 Abunai Deka Returns (1996) – Toshiki "Taka" Takayama
 Abunai Deka Forever: The Movie (1998) – Toshiki "Taka" Takayama
 Mada Mada Abunai Deka (2005) – Toshiki "Taka" Takayama
 Eight Ranger (2012)
 Saraba Abunai Deka (2016) – Toshiki "Taka" Takayama
 Life in Overtime (2018)
 The Great War of Archimedes (2019) – Isoroku Yamamoto
 A Family (2021)
 Fullmetal Alchemist: The Revenge of Scar (2022) – King Bradley
 Fullmetal Alchemist: The Final Alchemy (2022) – King Bradley

Television
 Seibu Keisatsu (1979–84) – first appears as Soutaro Tatsumi; nicknamed 'Tatsu' by his colleagues but dies in Episode 30 of Part I. Later appears as Eiji Hatomura, nicknamed 'Hato'.
 Abunai Deka (1986–89) – Toshiki "Taka" Takayama
 Seibu Keisatsu Special (2004）
 Kōmyō ga Tsuji (2006) – Oda Nobunaga
 Papa to Musume no Nanokakan (2007) – Kawahara Kyōichirō/ Kawahara Kōume
 Saka no Ue no Kumo (2010) – Shimamura Hayao
 Jun to Ai (2012–13) – Shin'ichirō Ōsaki
 Keisei Saimin no Otoko Part 1 (2015) – Inukai Tsuyoshi
 Natsume Sōseki no Tsuma (2016) – Shigekazu Nakane

Anime 

 Golgo 13 (2008–2009) – Duke Togo/Golgo 13

Video games 
 Yakuza 2 (2006) – Ryō Takashima

Discography
Hiroshi Tachi has released the following albums during his musical career.

Studio albums
 Golden Shadow (1 April 1988)
 Impressions (21 December 1988)
 異邦人 (Gentile) (2 March 1994)

Compilation
Tachi – The Best (12 May 1993)
Tachi – The Best Collection (2 November 2005)

Awards and honors

References

External links
 

Japanese male film actors
Japanese male rock singers
Japanese male television actors
Japanese male voice actors
Living people
1950 births
Male voice actors from Nagoya
Defstar Records artists
20th-century Japanese male actors
21st-century Japanese male actors
20th-century Japanese male singers
20th-century Japanese singers
21st-century Japanese male singers
21st-century Japanese singers
Recipients of the Order of the Rising Sun, 4th class